Major General Bernard Edward Cooke Dixon CB CBE MC (7 September 1896 – 9 October 1973) was a senior British Army officer.

Biography
Born on 7 September 1896, Bernard Cooke Dixon was educated at Bedford School and at the Royal Military Academy, Woolwich. He received his first commission in the Royal Engineers in 1915 and served in France during the First World War. During the Second World War he served in the Middle East, between 1940 and 1943, and in Italy, between 1943 and 1944.  He was Engineer-in-Charge at General Headquarters, Middle East, between 1944 and 1947, and Chief Engineer, Headquarters, Western Command, between 1947 and 1948.

Major General Bernard Cooke Dixon was invested as a Companion of the Order of the British Empire in 1944, and as a Companion of the Order of the Bath in 1947. He retired from the British Army in 1948. In the early 1950s he was managing director of East Kilbride Development Corporation. Bernard Cooke Dixon died on 9 October 1973.

References

1896 births
1973 deaths
British Army major generals
People educated at Bedford School
Graduates of the Royal Military Academy, Woolwich
British Army personnel of World War I
British Army personnel of World War II
Recipients of the Military Cross
Companions of the Order of the Bath
Commanders of the Order of the British Empire